CYP318A1 (ORF Name: Dmel_CG1786) is a Drosophila melanogaster gene belongs to the cytochrome P450 family, involved in the insecticide resistance.

References 

318
Drosophila melanogaster genes
EC 1.14